Askia Daoud (also Askia Dāwūd, Askiya Dawud) was the ruler of the Songhai Empire from 1549 to 1582. Daoud came to power unopposed following the death of his brother Askia Ishaq I in 1549. The Empire continued to expand under Daoud's peaceful rule, and saw little internal strife, until the invasion and interference of the Moroccan forces, which led to the empire's downfall in 1591.

Early life and influences 
Once located in West Africa, the flourishing Songhai Empire was stretched across the regions of Gao, Senegal, Gambia, NIgeria, Timbuktu and Djenne.  Under his father Askia Muhmmad's rule, the Songhai Empire experienced a thriving economy with Askia Muhmmad's idea of developing an Islamized society, through development of trade with neighboring regions and prioritizing education and literacy. By institutionalizing Islamic teachings and practices into the schools and economy, the Songhai Empire's Muslim population sought an exponential increase and prosperity flowed on all members of society. Muslim men became traders in gold and other valuables, various schools were built around the Islamic faith which increased literacy, and a centralized bureaucracy encouraged stability and strengthen the Empire. This period was known as "the Golden Age". Gaining from his fathers creation, Askia Daoud experienced great prosperity even during his rule over the empire, however, slowly afterwards the death of his father there was a gradual decline in sovereignty and the power of the empire.

Stability 
Stability, security and religion were some of the main focuses in the Askia family rulership. He, his brother, and his father had all organized a series of military campaigns against tributary territories of their large empire. The Songhai forces were known for their successes. Showing the importance of stability within the empire, both Askia Daoud and his brother, Askiya Al-Hajj Muhammad I, married the daughters of the empires southern people, the Saharan nomads to show their loyalty and desire for unity. Along with regional stability, religious unity was also a main concern, by marrying off his daughters to both the commercial estates and religious estates, the Empire was secured with connecting ties all around. By marrying off his daughters into thees religious estates, the Islamic faith was secured throughout following generations and so was the status of the future ones to come. However, after the death of Askia Muhammad, the peace was gradually starting to decrease in the empire during the reign of Askia Daoud when the Songhai Empire was attacked.

Songhai Empire's Decline 
In 1556–1557 troops of Mulay Muhammad al-Shaykh, the sultan of Marrakesh, captured the salt mines of Taghaza but then withdrew. Soon after his accession in 1578 Sultan Ahmad I al-Mansur of Morocco demanded the tax revenues from the salt mines. Askia Daoud responded by sending a large quantity of gold as a gift.With the invasion of the Morocco ruler, Ahmad al-Mansūr, over the dispute of the Taghaza's salt mines, the Songhai Empire started to face its gradual decline. The salt and gold mines were the main trading forces led by the Muslim population within the empire. The fight over who controlled these mines continued between the Songhai Empire and the Moroccans. However, throughout these numerous raids, the Moroccan army began modernizing their fighting tactics with the use of firearms, while the Songhai army failed to modernize and relied on spears, arrows and guerrilla warfare instead. With the failure to modernize, in 1591 the empire was finally defeated by the Moroccan forces. With the fall of the Songhai Empire the Moroccan powers continued to rule over the land for 100 years until the colonization of the French power arrived in West Africa.

References 

.
. Also available from Aluka but requires subscription.

1582 deaths
People of the Songhai Empire
16th-century monarchs in Africa
Year of birth unknown